= 200ER =

200ER may refer to:

- Boeing 767-200ER, aircraft variant
- Boeing 777-200ER, aircraft variant
- Bombardier CRJ-200ER, aircraft variant
